Mont Pinacle may refer to:

 Mount Pinacle in Coaticook, Quebec, Canada
 Mount Pinnacle in Frelighsburg, Quebec, Canada

See also
 Pinnacle (disambiguation)